Kateryna Vasylivna Bilokur (– 9 June 1961) was a Ukrainian folk artist born in the Poltava Governorate. Her birth date is unknown but 7 December is used as her official birthday. After an unpromising start, her works became known in the late 1930s and 1940s for their interest in nature. She was named People's Artist of Ukraine. It was said that Pablo Picasso saw her work exhibited in Paris and commented, "If we had an artist of this level, we would make the whole world talk about her."

Biography
Her birthday is celebrated on 24 November (7 December) in 1900, and she was born in a village of Bohdanivka.

At the age of 6 or 7, Bilokur learned to read. Her family decided not to send her to school to save money on shoes and clothes. She started drawing from a young age, though her parents frowned upon this hobby and wouldn't permit her do it. Bilokur continued drawing secretly, using old rags and coal.

"I stole a piece of white canvas from my mother and took a piece of coal... I shall draw something on one side of the rag, then I enjoy what I created, then I draw something on the other side... And this one time... I didn't draw something I saw, but rather some birds I imagined... My soul felt so happy because of what I could make up! I stared at my drawing, and laughed like crazy... That's when my parents busted me. They tore up my drawing and threw it in the oven... "What are you crazy? What are you doing? What would happen if other people saw you doing this? What devil will agree to marry you after this!.." But wherever I go, whatever I do - I have an image in my had that I simply have to draw, it follows me...I'm offended by Nature, it was cruel to me, by giving me this enormous love of holy drawing, and then took away any chance to create this marvelous work to the whole wide extent of my talent!"

She would draw decorations for a local drama club, organized by her neighbor and a distant relative, Nikita Tonkonog. Later, Bilokur would perform on the stage of this theater.

Between 1922-1923, Bilokur found out about a Myrhorod professional school of artistic ceramics. She embarked on a journey to Myrhorod with two drawings on her: a copy of a painting and a sketch of her grandfather's house, both on paper that she bought especially for this occasion. But she wasn't accepted to the professional school as she had no documents proving that she had finished seven years at her local school, so she returned home by foot.

The desire to draw never left her. Later, she started attending a drama class organized by two teachers who were a married couple, the Kalita.

Her parents agreed to her participating in plays, but on condition that her acting won't interfere with her house work. In 1928, Bilokur found out about a Kyiv Theatrical professional school and decided to try her luck there. But the situation repeated: she was rejected for the same reason.

In the autumn of 1934, she attempted suicide by drowning in the river Chumgak, and her feet were damaged by the cold. After the suicide attempt, her father finally agreed to let her draw.

Creative period

In the spring of 1940, Bilokur heard on the radio a song "Or was I not the viburnum on the meadow" performed by Oksana Petrusenko. The song impressed Bilokur so much that she wrote a letter to the singer, enclosing a drawing of a viburnum on a piece of canvas. The drawing struck the singer, and she, after consulting with friends - Vasily Kasiyan and Pavel Tychina - turned to the Folk Art Center. Soon, an order was received in Poltava - to go to the Bogdanivka village, find Bilokur, and inquire about her works.

Vladimir Khitko, who then headed the artistic and methodological council of the regional House of Folk Art, came to visit Bogdanivka. He showed several paintings by Kateryna Bilokur in Poltava to the artist Matvey Dontsov. In 1940, in the House of Folk Art in Poltava, a personal exhibit of the self-taught artist from Bogdanivka opened, which at that time consisted of only 11 paintings. The exhibition was a huge success and the artist was awarded with a trip to Moscow. Accompanied by Vladimir Khitko, she visited the Tretyakov Gallery and the Pushkin Museum.

In 1944, Vasily Nagai, the director of the State Museum of Ukrainian Folk Decorative Arts, visited Bogdanivka and acquired a number of paintings from Bilokur. It is thanks to this purchase that the Museum of Ukrainian Folk Decorative Arts has the best collection of Bilokur's works.

In 1949, Bilokur became a member in the Artists Union of Ukraine. In 1951 she was awarded the "Badge of Honor" and received the title of Honored Art Worker of the Ukrainian SSR. Three paintings by Bilokur - "Tsar Kolos", "Birch", and "Kolkhoz Field" - were included in the exposition of Soviet art at the International Exhibition in Paris (1954). Here, they were seen by Pablo Picasso, who spoke about Bilokur as follows: "If we had an artist of this level, we would have made the whole world talk about her!" In 1956, Bilokur received the title of "People's Artist" of the Ukrainian SSR. In subsequent years, the works of Bilokur were regularly exhibited at exhibitions in Poltava, Kyiv, Moscow and other cities.

The artist befriended artists and art critics who understood and respected her. Beside meetings with them, she carried a long correspondence with them from her village, Bogdanivka. Among such pen pals are the poet Pavel Tychina and his wife Lydia Petrovna, the art critic Stefan Taranushenko, director of the Museum of Ukrainian Folk Decorative Arts, Vasily Nagai, artists Elena Kulchitskaya, Matvey Dontsov, Emma Gurovich, and others. In Bogdanivka, she started teaching students: Olga Binchuk, Tamara Ganzha, and Anna Samarskaya.

Final years

In 1948, her father Vasily Bilokur died. Katheryna had lived with her sick mother for a while, and later, her brother Grigory with his wife and five children moved in with them. In the spring of 1961, her mother suffered from severe pain in the abdomen and legs. Home remedies did not help, and village pharmacy did not have the necessary medicines. In early June 1961, her 94-year-old mother died. In the same year, Bilokur was taken to the Yagotynsky regional hospital. On 10 June, she underwent an operation that did not succeed, and on the same day, Bilokur died. She was buried in her native village of Bogdanivka. The author of the tombstone is a sculptor called Ivan Gonchar.

Paintings
Most of Kateryna Bilokur's paintings were of flowers. She would often combine spring and autumn elements in her paintings, and such a picture was drawn from spring to autumn. For example, six dahlias in the painting "The collective farm field" were painted over three weeks. In addition to flowers, Bilokur painted landscapes and portraits. Several times she would try depicting a story of a stork bringing a child, but abandoned this idea due to confusion from others.

In the 1950s, Bilokur made her first attempts at watercolor painting. Her best works of that time - "The Village of Bohdanivka in September", "Beyond the Village" (1956), "Early Spring" (1958), "Autumn" (1960) - are characterized by extraordinary emotional expressiveness. In the last years of her life, marked by a serious illness, Bilokur created a number of notable canvases: "Daisies" (1958), "Peonies" (1958), "Bohdaniv Apples" (1959), "Bundle of Flowers" (1960) and others.

She did not work often with watercolor and grey pencil because she was more attracted to oil paints: "I made brushes myself - I took hairs of the same length from a cat's tail. Each paint has its own brush. I figured out the canvas priming technique by myself."

Tribute
On 7 December 2020, Google celebrated her 120th birthday with a Google Doodle.

References

External links

In English
Kateryna Bilokur - 54 artworks - painting - her paintings on WikiArt
Ukraine gateway
Katerina Bilokur on Ukrkolo.com

In Ukrainian
Картинна галерея Катерини Білокур
Дарина Горова Минуло 105 років від дня народження Катерини Білокур. «Україна Молода», № 234, 2005
Сто видатних імен в Україні

1900 births
1961 deaths
People from Kyiv Oblast
People from Piryatinsky Uyezd
20th-century Ukrainian painters
20th-century Ukrainian women artists
Recipients of the title of People's Painter of Ukraine